Axel Isadore Anderson (June 20, 1880 – September 6, 1961) was an American football player, coach of football, basketball, and wrestling, and anesthesiologist.  He was the first head basketball coach at the University of Missouri, serving one season, in 1906–07.  His 1906–07 Missouri Tigers men's basketball team twice beat the Kansas Jayhawks, coached by James Naismith, the inventor of basketball.

Anderson played college football at Missouri, lettering in 1901 and 1903, before graduating in 1904.  In addition to coaching basketball, he also was an assistant football coach and wrestling coach at his alma mater.  He later referred football in the Missouri River Valley.  Anderson worked as an anesthesiologist at Saint Luke's Hospital in Kansas City, Missouri from 1910 until his retirement in 1947.  He died at Saint Luke's, on September 6, 1961.

Head coaching record

Basketball

References

External links
 

1880 births
1961 deaths
American anesthesiologists
American football officials
Missouri Tigers football coaches
Missouri Tigers football players
Missouri Tigers men's basketball coaches
Missouri Tigers wrestling coaches